Runtigadhi is a Rural municipality located within the Rolpa District of the Lumbini Province of Nepal.
The rural municipality spans  of area, with a total population of 27,929 according to a 2011 Nepal census.

On March 10, 2017, the Government of Nepal restructured the local level bodies into 753 new local level structures.
The previous Jhenam, Sakhi, Jauli Pokhari, Masina, Dubring, portion of Jedwang and Dubidanda VDCs were merged to form Runtigadhi Rural Municipality.
Runtigadhi is divided into 9 wards, with Jhenam declared the administrative center of the rural municipality.

Demographics
At the time of the 2011 Nepal census, Runtigadhi Rural Municipality had a population of 28,517. Of these, 98.6% spoke Nepali, 1.3% Magar and 0.1% Hindi as their first language.

In terms of ethnicity/caste, 43.0% were Magar, 29.7% Chhetri, 13.4% Kami, 4.4% Damai/Dholi, 3.9% Sanyasi/Dasnami, 3.1% Sarki, 1.3% Thakuri, 0.3% Hill Brahmin, 0.2% other Dalit and 0.7% others.

In terms of religion, 94.8% were Hindu, 4.1% Christian, 0.4% Buddhist and 0.7% others.

References

External links
official website of the rural municipality

Rural municipalities in Rolpa District
Rural municipalities of Nepal established in 2017